KIBE (104.9 FM) is a radio station licensed to Broken Bow, Oklahoma, United States. The station is currently owned by Eastern Oklahoma State College.

History
This station was assigned call sign KIBE on December 17, 2012.

References

External links
http://www.radio.eosc.edu/

IBE
Radio stations established in 2012